The Epitome of Hyperbole is a 2008 Comedy Central Presents special featuring comedian Brian Regan. It first aired on September 6, 2008. An extended DVD with 42 minutes of uncensored content was released by Paramount Home Video and Comedy Central on September 9, 2008.

Segments
During the show, Regan jokes about the truth behind psychics, discusses the stupidest crimes, and offers his suggestions on how to improve the opera. Along with avoiding profanity, Regan skirts topical politics and offers observational musings layered with self-deprecating admissions that he shares, such as reading complex prose that makes his brain freeze, and over-his-head pretentious party conversations accidentally stumbled into. He then goes on to explain how he eats gravy and drinks juice from a baby bottle.

References

External links

Stand-up comedy concert films
Comedy Central original programming
2008 films